Dwight Jones may refer to:
T. A. Dwight Jones (1887–1957), American football player and coach in the United States
Dwight Clinton Jones (born 1948), mayor of Richmond, Virginia
Dwight Jones (basketball) (1952–2016), American basketball player
Dwight Sean Jones (defensive end) (born 1962), American football player
Dwight Jones (American football) (born 1989), American football player
Dwight Lamon Jones, perpetrator of the 2018 Scottsdale shootings

See also
Jones (surname)